The 2000 Individual Speedway Junior World Championship was the 24th edition of the World motorcycle speedway Under-21 Championships. The event was won by Andreas Jonsson of Sweden and he also gained qualification to the Speedway Grand Prix Challenge.

World final
August 27, 2000
 Gorzów Wielkopolski, Edward Jancarz Stadium

References

2000
World I J
Wor
Speedway competitions in Poland